Harry Harvey (December 14, 1846 – April 2, 1896), originally named Harry Huckman, was a member of the United States Army who fought for the Union during the American Civil War, where he was awarded the Medal of Honor. He was born on December 14, 1846 in England, but moved to Rochester, New York. He entered service in Rochester, New York, and became a Corporal of Company A of the 22nd New York Company. He was awarded the Medal of Honor for action on March 2, 1865 in Waynesboro, Virginia. There, he is cited as capturing the "flag and bearer, with two other prisoners." He was issued his Medal of Honor on March 26, 1865. Harvey died on April 2, 1896, in Syracuse, New York, and was buried in Myrtle Hill Cemetery.

See also
Battle of Waynesboro, Virginia
Carolinas Campaign
Philip Sheridan

Notes

References

External links

1846 births
1896 deaths
Union Army officers
United States Army Medal of Honor recipients
American Civil War recipients of the Medal of Honor
English-born Medal of Honor recipients
English emigrants to the United States